Personnel branches, in the Canadian Armed Forces (CAF), are groupings of related military occupations.

Personnel branches were officially established at unification in 1968 to amalgamate the old Canadian Army corps and similar occupational groupings in the Royal Canadian Navy and Royal Canadian Air Force.

According to Canadian Forces Administrative Orders (CFAOs),

"Personnel Branches were created to enable members of the Canadian Forces in related occupations to identify with each other in cohesive professional groups. These groups are based on similarity of military roles, customs and traditions." –CFAO 2-10 

Branches are applicable to all members of the rank of colonel/captain (N) and below; flag and general officers normally do not belong to branches. Exceptions to this rule are the judge advocate general (Legal Branch), the chaplain general (Royal Canadian Chaplain Service), and the surgeon general (Royal Canadian Medical Service).

Military occupations for officers and non-commissioned members are grouped within a particular branch under the coordination of the Director – Military Human Resource Requirements (DMHRR) and the approval of the Chief of Military Personnel.

Uniforms

Assignment of distinctive environmental uniform (i.e. "navy", "army", "air force" or "special operations") is a function of military occupation, not personnel branch. For example, within the Communications and Electronics Branch, all signal operators are uniformed army and all aerospace telecommunication and information systems technicians are designated as air force. On the other hand, within the Royal Canadian Logistics Service, supply technicians may be designated as any environment.

Branch advisors
Each Branch has its own branch advisor — normally a colonel or naval captain — to the Chief of the Defence Staff.

Branch traditions
Branches have carried forward many of the traditions inherited from their corps or service predecessors. They have authorized marches, differences in accessories and accoutrements for full dress and mess dress uniforms, branch-specific toasts, ceremonial commanders such as colonels-in-chief, etc. For example:
 The Armoured Branch retained the black beret and resurrected the name of the former Royal Canadian Armoured Corps.
 Army Signals officers of the Communications and Electronics Branch are permitted to wear box spurs with mess dress, a tradition inherited from the Royal Canadian Corps of Signals.
 The Air Operations Branch uses "RCAF March Past" as its authorized march.
 The Naval Operations Branch inherited its cap badge system from the old Royal Canadian Navy: one badge for officers and chief petty officer first classes, one for chief petty officer second classes and petty officers, and another for master sailors and below.

List of personnel branches 
The following is a list of CF personnel branches in order of precedence:

 Naval Operations Branch
 Royal Canadian Armoured Corps
 Royal Regiment of Canadian Artillery
 Canadian Military Engineers
 Communications and Electronics Branch
 Royal Canadian Infantry Corps
 Air Operations Branch
 Royal Canadian Logistics Service
 Royal Canadian Medical Service
 Royal Canadian Dental Corps
 Corps of Royal Canadian Electrical and Mechanical Engineers
 Royal Canadian Chaplain Service
 Canadian Forces Military Police
 Legal Branch
 Music Branch
 Personnel Selection Branch
 Training Development Branch
 Public Affairs Branch
 Intelligence Branch
 Cadet Instructors Cadre
 Special Operations Forces Branch

References 

Canadian Armed Forces personnel branches